Statistics of National Association Foot Ball League in season 1915–16.

Season overview
The 1915-1916 NAFBL season began the last Sunday of September 1915 and ran through the end of April 1916.

League standings
                          GP   W   L   T   Pts
 Harrison Alley Boys        8   5   2   1   11
 Kearny Scots               7   4   2   1    9
 Bayonne Babcock & Wilcox   5   3   0   2    8
 West Hudson A.A.           3   1   0   2    4
 Brooklyn F.C.              3   1   2   0    2
 Jersey A.C.                4   0   4   0    0
 Haledon Thistles           (withdrew during season)
 New York Clan MacDonald    (withdrew before start of season)

References
NATIONAL ASSOCIATION FOOT BALL LEAGUE (RSSSF)

1915-16
1915–16 domestic association football leagues
1915–16 in American soccer